The 2012 Copa de la Reina de Balonmano was the 33rd edition of the Spanish women's handball national cup, running between 12 and 15 April 2012 in Altea. SD Itxako defeated BM Bera Bera in the final to win its third title in a row.

Knockout stage

Quarter-finals

Semifinals

Final

References

2012
2011–12 in Spanish handball